Lo Wai-kwok,  (born 25 December 1953) is a member of the Legislative Council of Hong Kong for the Engineering constituency since 2012 LegCo election, representing the Business and Professionals Alliance for Hong Kong (BPA). In 2016, he succeeded Andrew Leung to become the chairman of the BPA.

Professional background and business career
Lo was born in the grassroots family and raised in a public estate. He graduated from the University of Hong Kong with a bachelor's degree in Mechanical Engineering and became an engineer by profession. He later obtained a master's degree in Industrial Engineering from the University of Hong Kong, a Master of Business Administration from the Chinese University of Hong Kong and a doctoral degree of engineering from the University of Warwick. He is a fellow of the Hong Kong Institution of Engineers, the Institution of Engineering and Technology and the Institution of Mechanical Engineers.

He moved to the Mainland China and opened a factory there in the 1980s and became a director of a technology company. For his business success, he was awarded Young Industrialist Awards of Hong Kong and the JCI Hong Kong Ten Outstanding Young Persons in 1992. He became the president of the Hong Kong Association for the Advancement of Science and Technology in 1997 and was the president of the Hong Kong Institution of Engineers from 2007 to 2008. He was the president of the Hong Kong Professionals and Senior Executives Association in 2014 and 2015.

Public career and Legislative Councillor
He has served in many public positions, including Council member of the City University of Hong Kong from 1991 to 1998, member of the Hong Kong Productivity Council from 1993 to 1997, member of the Town Planning Board, Council for Sustainable Development, Hong Kong Council for Testing and Certification, Research Grant Council and Advisory Council on the Environment; president of the Hong Kong Association for the Advancement of Science and Technology and the Guangdong-Hong Kong Association for the Promotion of Technology Enterprise; chairman of the Hong Kong Electronics Industry Council. He is currently member of the Hong Kong Housing Authority, the Hong Kong Hospital Authority, and the West Kowloon Cultural District Authority.

He has also been an appointed member of the Sha Tin District Council from July 1997 to December 2011. In the 2012 Legislative Council election, he was elected through the Engineering functional constituency in a four-way contest, beating incumbent Raymond Ho and pro-democrat Albert Lai. He co-founded the Business and Professionals Alliance for Hong Kong (BPA), a pro-business party in October 2012 and became its vice-chairman. In 2016, he succeeded Andrew Leung to become the party chairman after Leung was elected President of the Legislative Council.

For his contributions he was awarded Medal of Honour in 2001, justice of the peace in 2004, Bronze Bauhinia Star in 2009 and Silver Bauhinia Star in 2015.

References

External links
 Lo Wai-kwok's Official Website
 Members' Biographies Ir Dr Hon LO Wai-kwok, BBS, MH, JP

Living people
Hong Kong engineers
District councillors of Sha Tin District
Alumni of the University of Hong Kong
Alumni of the Chinese University of Hong Kong
Alumni of the University of Warwick
Business and Professionals Alliance for Hong Kong politicians
HK LegCo Members 2012–2016
HK LegCo Members 2016–2021
HK LegCo Members 2022–2025
Members of the Election Committee of Hong Kong, 1998–2000
Members of the Election Committee of Hong Kong, 2000–2005
Members of the Election Committee of Hong Kong, 2012–2017
1953 births
Recipients of the Bronze Bauhinia Star
Recipients of the Silver Bauhinia Star
Hong Kong racehorse owners and breeders
British expatriates in Hong Kong